John Payne (3 December 1889 – 28 August 1942) was an English amateur footballer who played as a defender for Leytonstone. He was capped by England at amateur level and was a part of the Great Britain at the 1920 Summer Olympics, but did not make an appearance.

Personal life 
Payne served as a sergeant in the Training Reserve during the First World War.

References

External links
 

1889 births
1942 deaths
English footballers
Olympic footballers of Great Britain
Footballers at the 1920 Summer Olympics
Association football defenders

People from Camberwell
Leytonstone F.C. players
British Army personnel of World War I
England amateur international footballers